German submarine U-701 was a Type VIIC U-boat built for the Nazi Germany's Kriegsmarine that served in the North Atlantic during World War II. It was launched on 16 April 1941 under the command of Kapitänleutnant Horst Degen, with a crew of 43.

She also sank four auxiliary warships and damaged a destroyer.

Fate
U-701 was sunk on 7 July 1942 off Cape Hatteras.
While running on the surface U-701 was attacked by a Hudson of 396 Sqdn USAAF. She was hit by two bombs and sunk. 17 of her crew were able to escape, but were adrift for two days before being found and rescued by the US Coast Guard. By that time just 7 men had survived.

Final resting place

Majority of the debris lies within  radius of the wreck. This wreck has become an artificial reef that is heavily populated with Seriola dumerili.

The wreck of the U-701 was originally discovered by Uwe Lovas in the coastal waters off Cape Hatteras in 1989. The location of the wreck and the site remained a closely guarded secret and therefore undisturbed for 15 years. The U-701 represents a virtually intact, pristine wreck site and a unique opportunity to explore and experience an unspoiled U-boat within recreational diving depths on the East Coast of the United States.

Recently, the vessel's location has been rediscovered and the coordinates have become accessible to the general public, who have already begun diving the site. An overwhelming majority of the local recreational and wreck diving community is deeply concerned about the potential for disturbance, damage and loss resulting from unauthorized salvage. The site was listed on the National Register of Historic Places in 2015.

A dive to the wreck in 2011 was documented in the National Geographic TV documentary, Hitler's Secret Attack on America (2013).

Wolfpacks
U-701 took part in three wolfpacks, namely:
 Zieten (6 – 22 January 1942) 
 Westwall (2 – 12 March 1942) 
 York (12 – 26 March 1942)

Summary of raiding history

See also
 Lists of shipwrecks

References

Notes

Citations

Bibliography

External links
 
Article by Paul M. Hudy
Article about preserving the U-701 on the Project Aware website
A blog about the U-701

German Type VIIC submarines
U-boats commissioned in 1941
U-boats sunk in 1942
World War II submarines of Germany
1941 ships
U-boats sunk by US aircraft
Ships built in Hamburg
World War II shipwrecks in the Atlantic Ocean
Shipwrecks of the Carolina coast
Maritime incidents in July 1942
National Register of Historic Places in Dare County, North Carolina
Shipwrecks on the National Register of Historic Places in North Carolina
World War II on the National Register of Historic Places